Sean Francis (or variants) may refer to:

 Sean Francis (footballer) (born 1972), former footballer
 Sean Francis (actor), actor 
 Shaun Francis, Jamaican footballer
 Shawn Francis in 2014 USA Indoor Track and Field Championships